The Vermilion River is a river in northern Ohio in the United States. The name alludes to the reddish clay that is the predominant local soil along its route. The river is commonly muddy after rains.

The river receives returns of stocked steelhead trout from the ODNR each fall through spring.  This is the westernmost river, in Ohio, that the ODNR stocks yearly with steelhead trout. During the end of spring the fish return to lake Erie for the summer and will return to the river in the fall. The river is also home to smallmouth bass, largemouth bass, rock bass, channel catfish, bullhead, longnose gar, various suckers, bluegill, sunfish, carp, crappie, freshwater drum, various minnows and darters, crayfish, and a variety of aquatic insects.

Course

The Vermilion River flows from Mud Lake in the town of Bailey Lakes in Ashland County and follows a generally northward course through Huron, Erie and Lorain counties, past the towns of Savannah and Wakeman.  It enters Lake Erie in Erie County at the city of Vermilion.

A short distance before the river enters Lake Erie, near State Route 2, it passes through a deep gorge.  The Vermilion rest area along the northern (westbound) side of Route 2 features a short nature trail leading to an overview of the gorge.  A major archaeological site, known as the Franks Site, sits atop the gorge walls; it was once a large village of the Erie tribe.

Three short tributaries are known as branches or forks of the Vermilion River.  The Southwest Branch Vermilion River and the East Branch Vermilion River join the Vermilion in Huron County.  The East Fork Vermilion River rises in Lorain County and joins the Vermilion in Erie County.

Variant names
The United States Board on Geographic Names settled on "Vermilion River" as the stream's official name in 1899.  According to the Geographic Names Information System, the Vermilion River has also been known as:
Oulame Thepy
Vermillion River
River en Grys

History
The Vermilion River (formerly spelled "Vermillion"- double 'L') has been known by that name since at least 1760 in explorer George Croghan's journal, and was also recorded by that name in Montressor's 1764 journal of the Bradstreet expedition; and its location is denoted correctly on a 1778 map by Hutchins. 
"Thepy"(or "sepe"/"sipi") was a Native word for 'river' or 'creek'; and "Oulame" may translate directly as 'paint' -- this River seems to be referred to as "Paint Creek" by later 18th-century European inhabitants —- it is said that the local Native-Americans used the purplish-red clay from along this river, as a sort of paint on their bodies (by mixing it with bright red berry juices). But the name "Vermillion" undoubtedly was an attribution by the first European explorers here, who apparently presumed that the red clay-and-berry mixture was the same as the substance (and highly valuable European commodity) 'vermillion' -- and although the native's body-paint really instead turned out to be made from worthless brownish-purple mud, but the name "vermillion" stuck anyway. 
[source, Diary (1787–1791) of David Zeisberger, (publ.1885 by Robert Clarke and Co., Cinti.)] 
The prior spelling for this river was "Vermillion" (double 'L') until about the end of the 19th-century, when the double 'L' was dropped, reportedly due to the spelling conflict with nearby Ashland County's township of 'Vermillion' (which is not upon this river). But an urban-myth circulating in the city of Vermilion in the early 1970s claims that the name "Vermillion" lost its second 'L' because it was more expensive to paint two L's on the water tower. 
Although the Geographic Names Server also listed (erroneously) the "River en Grys" as an alternate name for the Vermilion River and also (erroneously) for the Black River, but actually that name ("Riviere en Grys") was originally intended for what is now called Beaver Creek, which is in between these two rivers. [The "Riviere en Grys" appears on Hutchins 1778 map, east of the "Vermillion River" and west of the "Reneshoua"(the Black River).]

See also
List of rivers of Ohio
Vermilion, Ohio

References

External links
Vermilion River Property Rights Association

Rivers of Ohio
Rivers of Ashland County, Ohio
Rivers of Erie County, Ohio
Rivers of Huron County, Ohio
Rivers of Lorain County, Ohio
Tributaries of Lake Erie